Paulo Lourenço Martins Alves (born 10 December 1969) is a Portuguese former professional footballer who played as a centre-forward, currently manager of Moreirense.

He amassed Primeira Liga totals of 301 matches and 78 goals over 13 seasons, mainly with Gil Vicente (five years). He also represented in the competition Marítimo, Sporting CP (three apiece) União de Leiria (two) and Braga.

Alves started coaching in 2005, and went on to be in charge of several clubs including Gil (in several spells).

Playing career
Born in Vila Real, Alves moved from local club to FC Porto's youth ranks at 17, but had no success there, moving to Gil Vicente F.C. as a member of which he helped Portugal win the 1989 FIFA World Youth Championship in Saudi Arabia – in the group stage opener against Czechoslovakia, he scored a last-minute header (his strongest asset) for the game's only goal. Later in his career he also managed 13 caps for the full side, scoring seven times, mostly during the UEFA Euro 1996 qualifying stage and friendlies within that period.

After spells with F.C. Tirsense, C.S. Marítimo (twice) and S.C. Braga, Alves joined Primeira Liga giants Sporting CP, being relatively used during his three-year stay. He also played in England with West Ham United on loan, but managed just four substitute appearances in a three-month spell. Upon his return to Lisbon, he notably scored a hat-trick in a 5–3 win at S.C. Campomaiorense.

Alves then spent two seasons with U.D. Leiria, netting six times in 27 matches in 2000–01 to help the club to its best-ever finish in the top flight, a fifth position. His second stint at Gil Vicente saw him finish as team top scorer for the 2001–02 campaign, with 11 goals from 27 appearances. He retired in June 2005, at the age of 35.

Coaching career
Alves took up coaching immediately after retiring, precisely with the Barcelos club. In 2008 he joined another team he played for, Leiria, also in the Segunda Liga.

Due to poor results in the 2008–09 season, Alves was sacked by União de Leiria, but stayed in that league by moving to F.C. Vizela. In the following summer he rejoined former Sporting teammate Oceano's coaching staff at the Portugal under-21 side, while also being charged with the under-20s; after a handful of games he resigned and returned to Gil Vicente, winning the 2011 second-division championship with the subsequent promotion.

After three years, which also brought a runner-up place in the Taça da Liga, Alves replaced former national teammate Abel Xavier at the helm of S.C. Olhanense early into the 2013–14 campaign, being dismissed after less than three months in charge and with only one point won in six league matches.

Alves returned to management in December 2014, taking the helm at S.C. Beira-Mar, 14th in the second tier. The team suffered with serious financial problems over the season, and were sent to the Aveiro Football Association's second division as a punishment.

On 3 December 2015, Alves was appointed at F.C. Penafiel until the end of the division two season, having been working in Iran for F.C. Nassaji Mazandaran. He remained in the job until being hired by C.F. União for 2017–18, being relieved of his duties on 2 October with the side placed 12th. He returned to Gil Vicente halfway through the campaign, and left on 23 February 2018 by mutual agreement having not won any of his seven fixtures.

After a few months back in the Middle East with Ohod Club of Saudi Arabia, Alves returned to the Portuguese second tier in June 2019, at Varzim SC. He was dismissed on 18 October 2020, after three consecutive defeats in a five-game winless run.

On 8 June 2022, Alves was hired by newly relegated Moreirense FC. He helped the club through their Taça da Liga group, at the expense of national leaders S.L. Benfica on goals scored.

Career statistics

International goals

|}

Honours

Player
Sporting CP
Supertaça Cândido de Oliveira: 1995

Portugal
FIFA U-20 World Cup: 1989

Manager
Gil Vicente
Segunda Liga: 2010–11
Taça da Liga runner-up: 2011–12

References

External links

1969 births
Living people
People from Vila Real, Portugal
Sportspeople from Vila Real District
Portuguese footballers
Association football forwards
Primeira Liga players
Liga Portugal 2 players
Gil Vicente F.C. players
F.C. Tirsense players
C.S. Marítimo players
S.C. Braga players
Sporting CP footballers
U.D. Leiria players
Premier League players
West Ham United F.C. players
Ligue 1 players
SC Bastia players
Portugal youth international footballers
Portugal under-21 international footballers
Portugal international footballers
Olympic footballers of Portugal
Footballers at the 1996 Summer Olympics
Portuguese expatriate footballers
Expatriate footballers in England
Expatriate footballers in France
Portuguese expatriate sportspeople in England
Portuguese expatriate sportspeople in France
Portuguese football managers
Primeira Liga managers
Liga Portugal 2 managers
Gil Vicente F.C. managers
U.D. Leiria managers
F.C. Vizela managers
S.C. Olhanense managers
S.C. Beira-Mar managers
F.C. Penafiel managers
Varzim S.C. managers
Moreirense F.C. managers
F.C. Nassaji Mazandaran managers
Saudi Professional League managers
Ohod Club managers
Portuguese expatriate football managers
Expatriate football managers in Iran
Expatriate football managers in Saudi Arabia
Portuguese expatriate sportspeople in Iran
Portuguese expatriate sportspeople in Saudi Arabia